Sandy Rios is an American Family Association member, governmental affairs director, a Fox News Channel contributor, and a talk radio host.

She is chairman of the North Korean Freedom Coalition, a coalition that advocates for the citizens of North Korea.

In July 2013, Rios was identified as a key member of Groundswell, a secretive coalition of right wing activists and journalists attempting to make radical political change behind the scenes.

In January 2007, she returned as WYLL afternoon host through July 2010.

Rios was given the 2005 Henry Hyde Leadership Award, a Pro-Life Action League's "Protector Award", Eagle Forum's Excellence Award and Family PAC's 1999 "Conservative of the Year".

In 2015, she publicly claimed the sexual orientation of an AMTRAK engineer on duty during the 2015 Philadelphia train derailment was a possible factor in the crash.

References

External links

Living people
1949 births
American anti-abortion activists
Christian fundamentalism